Emilio Gastón Sanz (8 January 1935 – 22 January 2018) was a Spanish politician, lawyer, and poet.

A native of Zaragoza born in 1935, Gastón was a practicing lawyer. He was elected to the constituent Congress of Deputies as a representative of Zaragoza in 1977, and served until 1979. Gastón was the Justicia de Aragón ("Justice of Aragon", a regional ombudsman) between 1987 and 1993, the first person to assume the position after promulgation of the Statute of Autonomy. He was married to poet Mari Carmen Gascón Baquero.

References

1935 births
2018 deaths
Ombudsmen in Spain
20th-century Spanish judges
Members of the constituent Congress of Deputies (Spain)
Aragonese-language writers
People from Zaragoza